Mahdia Governorate is in central-eastern Tunisia, named after its largest town and administrative centre. It comprises an area of coastal relative lowland, but extends further inland than its coastal length. It is one of the twenty-four governorates (provinces). It covers an area of 2,966 km²,  and has a population of 410,812 (as at the 2014 census).  Four other governorates are its neighbours - clockwise from south, Sfax, Kairouan, Sousse and Monastir Governorates.

Economic summary

Mahdia, the administrative centre, is a coastal resort with prominent weaving and fish processing industries.

The other coastal urban centre is the small town of Chebba, on the headland of a bay.  Ksour Essef is midway between these towns and approximately 2.5 km inland.  El Djem is 13 km inland and a mid-sized town on a major crossroads of roads in the district and having Tunisia's main north-south railway. The nearest international airport is connected by road and rail and is 15 km north of Mahdia (the town), Monastir Habib Bourguiba International Airport.

Synopsis of history

The two main coastal cities are of historic note to Greek, Roman, and early Muslim societies. They include the Mahdia shipwreck – a sunken ship found off Mahdia's shore, containing Greek art treasures – dated to about 80 BC, the early part of Roman rule in this region.  The old part of Mahdia corresponds to the Roman city called Aphrodisium and, later, called Africa (a name perhaps derived from the older name), or Cape Africa.

Climate

The climate is semiarid throughout particularly in the summer and due to the high albedo effects compared to provinces of the far north, nighttime temperatures tend to fall more, to a similar temperature to average upland parts of the north.  Much of the developed area benefits from the Sousse area's advanced water distribution network from dammed rivers and lakes including those hundreds of miles to the west which provides water for domestic use and pools.

Administrative divisions
The governorate is divided into eleven delegations (mutamadiyat), listed below with their populations at the 2004 and 2014 Censuses:

Eighteen municipalities are in Mahdia Governorate: Bou Merdes, Bradaa, Chebba, Chorbane, Eljem, Essouassi, Hebira, Hkaima, Kerker, Ksour Essef, Mahdia, Melloulèche, Ouled Chamekh, Rejiche, Sidi Alouane, Sidi Zid, Tlelsa and Zelba.

Electorally and for some more national purposes, Mahdia has eleven delegations, most boundaries of which are similar to the governorates.

See also
Mansoura, Tunisia

References

 
Governorates of Tunisia